Sung Shuo-yun (born 15 June 1997) is a Taiwanese badminton player. She won her first international title at the 2019 Norwegian International.

Achievements

BWF World Tour (1 runner-up)
The BWF World Tour, which was announced on 19 March 2017 and implemented in 2018, is a series of elite badminton tournaments sanctioned by the Badminton World Federation (BWF). The BWF World Tours are divided into levels of World Tour Finals, Super 1000, Super 750, Super 500, Super 300, and the BWF Tour Super 100.

Women's singles

BWF International Challenge/Series (5 titles, 9 runners-up) 
Women's singles

Women's doubles

  BWF International Challenge tournament
  BWF International Series tournament
  BWF Future Series tournament

References

External links 
 

Living people
1997 births
Taiwanese female badminton players
21st-century Taiwanese women